Francis Alexander Spalding Warden Thomson (15 May 1917 – 6 December 1987) was a Scottish Roman Catholic clergyman who served as the Bishop of Motherwell from 1964 to 1982.

Born in Edinburgh, Scotland on 15 May 1917, he was ordained to the priesthood on 15 June 1946 for the Archdiocese of St Andrews and Edinburgh. He was curate of St Patrick's, Kilsyth 1946-1948, St James', St Andrews 1949-1952 and St Cuthbert's, Edinburgh 1952-1953. He was on staff at St Andrew's College, Drygrange from 1953-1960 and was Rector of St Mary's College, Blairs from 1960-1964.

He was appointed the Bishop of the Diocese of Motherwell by the Holy See on 8 December 1964, and consecrated to the Episcopate on 24 February 1965. The principal consecrator was Archbishop James Donald Scanlan of Glasgow, and the principal co-consecrators were Bishop James Black of Paisley and Bishop Stephen McGill of Argyll and the Isles (later Bishop of Paisley). He attended the fourth session of the Second Vatican Council in 1965.

He resigned on 14 December 1982 and assumed the title Bishop Emeritus of Motherwell. He retired to Biggar as parish priest and died on 6 December 1987, aged 70.

References 

1917 births
1987 deaths
Clergy from Edinburgh
20th-century Roman Catholic bishops in Scotland
Roman Catholic bishops of Motherwell
Scottish Roman Catholic bishops